Captain John Allen, 1st Viscount Allen,  (13 February 1660 – 8 November 1726), was an Irish peer and politician.

He was born in Dublin, the son of Sir Joshua Allen, and educated at Trinity College Dublin.

In 1691 he was appointed High Sheriff of County Dublin and then represented Dublin County as an MP three times, from 1692 to 1693, from 1703 to 1713 and from 1715 to 1717. Allen sat also as Member of Parliament (MP) for Carlow County between 1795 and 1703 and then for Wicklow County between 1713 and 1715. On 28 August 1717, he was created Baron Allen, of Stillorgan, in County Dublin, and Viscount Allen in County Kildare.

Family
He married Mary FitzGerald, daughter of Hon. Robert FitzGerald, son of The 16th Earl of Kildare and Lady Jane Boyle, on 23 July 1684. They had three children:

Joshua Allen, 2nd Viscount Allen (1685–1742)
Hon. Richard A. Allen b. bet. 1687 – 1697, died 1745; he married Dorothy Greene, daughter of Major Samuel Greene of Killaghy, County Tipperary, and had issue, including the 4th and 5th Viscounts
Hon. Robert Allen (died 1741): he married Frances Johnson, daughter of Robert Johnson, Baron of the Court of Exchequer (Ireland) and Margaret Dixon of Calverstown, County Kildare, and had five children, including two surviving daughters, Mary and Frances.

References

1660 births
1726 deaths
Irish MPs 1692–1693
Irish MPs 1695–1699
Irish MPs 1703–1713
Irish MPs 1713–1714
Irish MPs 1715–1727
Members of the Privy Council of Ireland
Peers of Ireland created by George I
High Sheriffs of County Dublin
Members of the Irish House of Lords
Members of the Parliament of Ireland (pre-1801) for County Dublin constituencies
Members of the Parliament of Ireland (pre-1801) for County Carlow constituencies
Members of the Parliament of Ireland (pre-1801) for County Wicklow constituencies
Alumni of Trinity College Dublin
John 1